Distar may refer to:

DiStar, an electronics manufacturer based in Thailand
DISTAR, a method of direct instruction for teaching reading
Distar Air, a Czech aircraft manufacturer
Společnost DISTAR CZ a.s., a diversified Czech manufacturing company